HC Zenit Saint Petersburg (Russian: Гандбольный клуб «Зенит» ; previously was known as HC Neva) is a Russian handball team located in Saint Petersburg. Their home matches are played at the Yubileyny Sports Palace.

They compete in the Russian Handball Super League and in the SEHA League. As the national medalist club competed in the EHF Champions League in 2010–2014.

In reaction to the 2022 Russian invasion of Ukraine, the International Handball Federation banned Russian athletes, and the European Handball Federation suspended the  Russian clubs from competing in European handball competitions.

History

Origins
In the 1950s, a handball team "Trud" was created at the Vulcan plant in Leningrad by the initiative of Nikolai Vishnyakov and Yuri Romanov. This team was the first in the history of Leningrad to receive the right to compete in the USSR championship, but it was not possible to achieve serious success, as the team was amateur and could not fight on an equal footing with the grandees of domestic handball.

Creation and First years
In 1964, a team of the same name was created at the Bolshevik plant. Viktor Dmitrievich Fomenko was instructed to train the team. The Bolshevik team could not achieve special success and after the division of the USSR championship into divisions, it was in the lowest third.

Neva
In 1973, the team was able to make it to the top division, but under a new name: HC Neva.

In 1979, on the basis of the academy named after P. F. Lesgaft a sports school was opened, from which many famous handball players came out, who later joined the senior team.

In 1993, Neva became the first Russian handball champion. The preliminary stage of Neva finished in the first place. In the superfinal, Neva met with the team from Chelyabinsk "Polyot", which took second place at the end of the preliminary stage. The final went up to two victories. Neva won away with a score of 29:26 and at home 29:27, becoming the first champion of Russia in history. However, then the club lost ground and next time became a prize-winner only more than 10 years later.

Since 2001, the team has been called "Stepan Razin - Neva" and under the leadership of Yuri Alexandrovich Babenko became the bronze medalist of the Russian Championship 2004/05. Soon the club lost its title sponsor, which led to financial problems, and the team was forced to refuse to participate in Super League matches. As a result, the club was supported by the university named after P. F. Lesgaft, and a year later the team called "University - Neva" returned to the Super League, and since the 2009/2010 season, the club has become the silver medalist of the Russian championship five times in a row under the leadership of Dmitry Torgovanov, second only to the permanent champion: Chekhov Bears.

Zenit
On October 2, 2022, the club has been renamed to Zenit, and became a section of FC Zenit, alongside BC Zenit, VC Zenit and WFC Zenit. All sponsored by the government-owned gaz corporation Gazprom. Their first match under the rebranding was against CSKA Moscow in SEHA-Gazprom League, which ended with a draw (29:29).

Names 
1964—1973 — Bolshevik
1973—2001 — Neva
2001—2006 — Stepan Razin-Neva
2007—2022 — Universitet Lesgafta-Neva
Since 2022 — Zenit

Kits

Honours
Russian Handball Super League: 1
Winners : 1993

European record

Current roster
Squad for the 2022–23 season

Goalkeepers 
 77  Maxim Lapitski
 81  Maxim Popov
 99  Nikita Nikulin
Left Wingers
 25  Timur Solodovnikov
 26  Pavel Arkatov
Right Wingers
 11  Alexander Petrov
 14  Mikhail Gredasov
Line players
4  Aliaksei Archibasov
 13  Roman Stolyarov
 17  Gleb Chernov

Left Backs
2  Eldar Nasyrov
 19  Pavel Turaev
 90  Andrei Klimavets
Central Backs
 18  Aleh Lunya
 45  Alexander Arkatov
Right Backs
 75  Victar Babkin
 83  Anih Obinna

References

External links

Sports clubs in Saint Petersburg
Russian handball clubs